"The Stand" is the lead single from Canadian band Mother Mother's third album, Eureka. It is the first song from Mother Mother to chart in the Canadian Hot 100, where it went to  No. 76.

Music video
The music video, for the most part, features band members Ryan Guldemond, Molly Guldemond, and Jasmin Parkin sitting in a white room with Ryan on one couch and the two women on the other. Molly and Jasmin are dressed oddly, and also have bizarre hairstyles. The two are giving Ryan a counseling session, and what they talk about appear as images on the walls. Occasionally, band members Ali Siadat and Jeremy Page also can be seen sitting on the couch with Ryan. The video also cuts to scenes of the band performing in the (presumably) same white room.

Charts

References

2011 singles
2010 songs
Mother Mother songs